Rubyozhny is a rural locality (a khutor) in Archedinskoye Rural Settlement, Frolovsky District, Volgograd Oblast, Russia. The population was 222 as of 2010.

Geography 
Rubyozhny is located northeast from Obraztsy, 34 km east of Prigorodny (the district's administrative centre) by road. Mansky is the nearest rural locality.

References 

Rural localities in Frolovsky District